Josipdol is a settlement in the Municipality of Ribnica na Pohorju in northeastern Slovenia. It lies in the Pohorje Hills in the upper valley of a small right tributary of the Drava River. The area is part of the traditional Styria region. It is now included in the Carinthia Statistical Region.

A quarry of local tonalite rock operates south of the settlement.

References

External links
Josipdol on Geopedia

Populated places in the Municipality of Ribnica na Pohorju